Flatwoods is a ghost town in Bokescreek Township, Logan County, Ohio, in the United States.

History
The first settlement at Flatwoods was made in 1854 by Christopher Williams. Flatwoods was originally built up exclusively by black people.

References

Geography of Logan County, Ohio
1854 establishments in Ohio
Populated places established in 1854